Megacephalini is a tribe of big-headed tiger beetles in the family Cicindelidae.

Genera
These genera belong definitively to the tribe Megacephalini, as they are groups often placed within the type genus Megacephala itself:
 Grammognatha Motschulsky, 1850
 Megacephala Latreille, 1802
 Metriocheila Thomson, 1857
 Phaeoxantha Chaudoir, 1850
 Pseudotetracha Fleutiaux, 1894
 Tetracha Hope, 1838 (metallic tiger beetles)

These genera are of less certain placement or status:
 Aniara Hope, 1838 (probable synonym of Tetracha)
 Callidema Guérin-Méneville, 1843 (unrelated to other megacephalines)
 Cheiloxya Guerin-Meneville, 1855  (genetically unrelated to other megacephalines)
 †Cretotetracha Zhao et al., 2019 (fossil taxon of uncertain affinity)
 Oxycheila Dejean, 1825 (genetically unrelated to other megacephalines)
 †Oxycheilopsis Cassola & Werner, 2004 (fossil taxon of uncertain affinity)
 Pseudoxycheila Guerin-Meneville, 1839 (genetically unrelated to other megacephalines)

References

Further reading

External links

 

Cicindelidae
Articles created by Qbugbot